This is a list of notable or influential albums in the history of punk rock.

List

1970
The Stooges – Fun House

1973
Iggy and the Stooges – Raw Power

1976
Ramones – Ramones

1977
The Damned – Damned Damned Damned
The Clash – The Clash
Sex Pistols – Never Mind the Bollocks, Here's the Sex Pistols
The Saints – I'm Stranded
Dead Boys – Young Loud and Snotty
The Stranglers - Rattus Norvegicus

1978
Buzzcocks – Love Bites
Crass – The Feeding of the 5000
Ramones – Road to Ruin
X-Ray Specs – Germ Free Adolescents
 The Clash – Give 'Em Enough Rope

1979
The Germs – (GI)
The Clash – London Calling
The Damned – Machine Gun Etiquette
The Ruts – The Crack
Stiff Little Fingers – Inflammable Material
The Undertones – The Undertones
U.K. Subs – Another Kind of Blues
The Slits – Cut

1980
Black Flag – Jealous Again
Circle Jerks – Group Sex
Dead Kennedys – Fresh Fruit for Rotting Vegetables
Killing Joke – Killing Joke
X – Los Angeles
The Wipers – Is this Real?

1981
The Adolescents – The Adolescents
Black Flag – Damaged
G.B.H. – Leather, Bristles, Studs, and Acne
The Exploited – Punks Not Dead
D.O.A. – Hardcore '81
Minor Threat – Minor Threat/In My Eyes
Mission of Burma – Signals, Calls, and Marches
Angelic Upstarts – 2,000,000 Voices

1982
Descendents – Milo Goes to College
Discharge – Hear Nothing, See Nothing, Say Nothing
Bad Brains – Bad Brains
Flipper – Generic Flipper
Fear – Fear The Record
Fang – Landshark
Angry Samoans – Back From Samoa
Youth Brigade – Sound and Fury
Anti-Nowhere League – We Are... The League
Meat Puppets – Meat Puppets
Misfits – Walk Among Us
Bad Religion- How could hell be any worse?

1983
Bad Brains – Rock for Light
Social Distortion – Mommy's Little Monster
Suicidal Tendencies – Suicidal Tendencies
Avengers – Avengers
Misfits – Earth A.D./Wolfs Blood

1984
Minutemen – Double Nickels on the Dime
Hüsker Dü – Zen Arcade
Black Flag – My War
Black Flag – Family Man
Black Flag – Slip It In

1985
Misfits – Legacy of Brutality
D.I. – Horse Bites Dog Cries
D.R.I. – Dealing With It!
Hüsker Dü – New Day Rising
The Replacements – Tim
Dead Milkmen – Big Lizard in My Backyard

1986
Bad Brains – I Against I
Cro-Mags – The Age of Quarrel
Misfits – Misfits (Misfits album)

1987
Napalm Death – Scum
Big Black – Songs About Fucking

1988
Bad Religion – Suffer
Sonic Youth – Daydream Nation
Social Distortion – Prison Bound
Nofx- liberal Animation
Fugazi – Fugazi

1989
ALL – Allroy's RevengeBad Religion – No ControlFugazi – 13 SongsMinor Threat – Complete DiscographyNOFX – S&M AirlinesOperation Ivy – EnergySick of It All – Blood, Sweat and No TearsRamones – Brain DrainThe Vandals – Peace Thru Vandalism / When in Rome Do as The Vandals1990
Bad Religion – Against the GrainFugazi – RepeaterPoison Idea – Feel the DarknessSocial Distortion – Social DistortionGreen Day – 39/SmoothNo use for a name- incognito

1991
Leatherface – MushPegboy – Strong ReactionNOFX- ribbed
Green Day- Kerplunk!
Pennywise- Pennywise

1992
Bad Religion – GeneratorThe Gits – Frenching the BullyLagwagon- Duh
NOFX- White trash two heebs and a bean
No use for a name- Don't Miss the Train

1993
Bad Religion – Recipe for HatePropaghandi – How to Clean EverythingPennywise -Unknown RoadTilt- Play Cell
Rancid- Rancid
No use for a name- Daily Grind
Ten Foot Pole- Swill
Millencolin- Use your nose
SNFU- Something green and leafy this way comes
R.K.L- reactivate

1994
Bad Religion – Stranger Than FictionGreen Day – DookieNOFX – Punk in DrublicThe Gits – Enter: The Conquering ChickenThe Offspring – SmashRancid – Let's GoSunny Day Real Estate – DiaryLagwagon -TrashedTen foot pole- Rev
Strung Out- Another day in paradise
Millencolin- Tiny tunes
R.K.L- riches to rags
Blink- Buddah
Frenzal Rhomb- Dick Sandwich E.p.
Millencolin- Skauch
Hi-Standard- Last of sunny day
Propagandhi/ I spy- I'd rather be flag burning
Gas huffer- One Inch Masters

1995
Jawbreaker – Dear YouQuicksand – Manic CompressionRancid – ...And Out Come the WolvesRocket From the Crypt – Scream, Dracula, Scream!Green Day – InsomniacJayne County -  Deviation No use for a name  - ¡Leche con Carne!Pennywise- About time
Blink-182 - Cheshire cat
Good riddance- For god and country
Millencolin- life on a plate
Lagwagon- Hoss
Frenzal Rhomb- Coughing up a storm
SNFU- The one voted most likely to succeed
Tilt- 'til it kills
Satanic Surfers- Hero of our time

1996
Misfits – Static AgeSocial Distortion – White Light, White Heat, White TrashSublime – SublimeChoking Victim – Squatta's ParadiseThe Suicide Machines – Destruction by DefinitionNOFX - Heavy Petting Zoo (eating lamb lp)  
Strung out- Suburban Teenage Wasteland Blues
Good riddance- A Comprehensive Guide to Moderne Rebellion
Pulley- Esteem Driven Engine
Propagandhi- Less talk more rock
Frenzal Rhomb- Not so tough now
Bad Religion- the gray race
Hi-Standard- Growing up
SNFU- FYULABA
Guttermouth- Teri yakimoto
H20- H20
MxPx- Life in general

1997
The Dwarves – The Dwarves Are Young and Good LookingGreen Day – NimrodThe Mighty Mighty Bosstones – Let's Face ItMisfits – American PsychoNOFX – So Long and Thanks for All the ShoesSleater-Kinney – Dig Me OutWill Haven – El DiabloDance Hall Crashers – Honey, I'm Homely!Save Ferris – It Means EverythingPulley - 60 Cycle HumNo use for a name - Making FriendsTen foot pole- Unleashed
Millencolin- for monkeys
Lagwagon- Double plaidinum
Blink-182- Dude Ranch
Frenzal Rhomb- meet the family
Hi-Standard- Angry Fist
Pennywise- Full Circle
Me First and the Gimme Gimmes- have a ball
Hi-Standard- The kids are alright
Satanic surfers- 666 Motor inn
H20- Thicker than water
The Offspring- Ixnay on the hombre

1998
Less Than Jake – Hello RockviewMxPx – Slowly Going the Way of the BuffaloThe Offspring – AmericanaRancid – Life Won't WaitRefused – The Shape of Punk to ComeThe Vandals – Hitler Bad, Vandals GoodCatch 22 – Keasbey NightsBad Religion- No substance
Strung Out- Twisted by design
Lagwagon- Let's talk about feelings
Ten foot pole- Insider
The Suicide Machines- Battle hyms
Good Riddance- Ballads From The Revolution
Propagandhi- Where quantity is job #1
Swingin' Utters- Five lessons learned
Dropkick Murphys- Do or Die
Tilt- Collect 'em all

1999
AFI – Black Sails in the SunsetBlink-182 – Enema of the StateThe Get Up Kids – Something to Write Home AboutThe Supersuckers – The Evil Powers of Rock 'N' RollChoking Victim – No Gods / No ManagersNOFX – The DeclineLe Tigre – Le Tigre Frenzal Rhomb -  A man's not a camel No use for a name- More Betterness!
Pulley- #@!*
Dropkick murphys- the gang's all here
Hi-Standard- Making the road
Good riddance- Operation Phoenix
Millencolin- The melancholy collection
Pennywise- Straight Ahead
Me first and the Gimme Gimmes- Are a drag
Tilt- Viewers like you
Satanic surfers- Going no where fast
H20- F.T.T.W.
Better than a thousand- Value Driven
2000
Rancid – RancidGreen Day – WarningAgainst All Authority – 24 Hour Roadside ResistanceMillencolin -Pennybridge PioneersNOFX- Pump up the valuum
Bad religion- the new america
Avail- One Wrench
Strung Out- The element of sonic defiance
Lagwagon- Lets talk about leftovers
Blink-182- The Mark, Tom, And Travis show
Frenzal Rhomb- Shut Your Mouth

2001
Pennywise – Land of the Free?Bandits of the Acoustic Revolution – A Call to ArmsLeftöver Crack – Mediocre Generica Rise Against  -The unravelingPropagandhi - Today's Empire Tomorrows ash's
Zero Down- With a lifetime to pay
Pulley- Together again for the first time
Blink-182- take off your pants and jacket
Good riddance - Symptoms of a leveling spirit

2002
Against Me! – Reinventing Axl RoseDillinger Four – Situationist ComedyThe Lawrence Arms – Apathy and ExhaustionBad Religion – The Process of BeliefTaking Back Sunday – Tell All Your FriendsXiu Xiu – Knife PlayStrung out- american paradox
Green day- Shenanigans
No use for a name- Hard rock bottom
Bad Astronaut- Houston: We have a drinking problem
Box car racer- Box car racer
Millencolin- Home from Home

2003
AFI – Sing the SorrowStreetlight Manifesto – Everything Goes NumbThrice – The Artist in the AmbulanceRx Bandits – The ResignationAgainst Me! – As the Eternal CowboyRise Against – Revolutions per MinuteLagwagon- Blaze
NOFX- war on errorism
Blink-182- Blink-182
Good riddance- bound by ties of blood and affection
Frenzal Rhomb- Sans Souci
Pennywise- From the Ashes
2004
Rise Against – Siren Song of the Counter CultureGreen Day – American IdiotDeath from Above – You're a Woman, I'm a MachineMy Chemical Romance – Three Cheers for Sweet RevengeLeftöver Crack – Fuck World TradeBad Religion – The Empire Strikes FirstPulley- Matters
Strung Out- Exile In Oblivion
Sum 41- chuck
2005
Dropkick Murphys – The Warrior's CodeBomb the Music Industry! – Album Minus BandAgainst Me! – Searching for a Former ClarityThe Academy Is... – Almost HereAJJ – Candy Cigarettes & Cap GunsBomb the Music Industry! – To Leave or Die in Long IslandLagwagon- Resolve
No use for a name- Keep them confused
Propagandhi- potemkin city limits
Millencolin- Kingwood
Pennywise- The Fuse

2006
Towers of London – Blood, Sweat and TowersBomb the Music Industry! – Goodbye Cool World!The Arrogant Sons of Bitches – Three Cheers for DisappointmentJay Reatard – Blood VisionsThe Thermals – The Body, the Blood, the MachineDefiance, Ohio – The Great DepressionStreetlight Manifesto – Keasbey NightsBomb the Music Industry! – Presidents Day Split 7″NOFX- wolves in wolves clothing
Bad Astronaut- Twelve small steps, one giant disappointment
Good riddance- My republic
Frenzal rhomb- Forever Malcom Young

2007
Bomb the Music Industry! – Get WarmerAJJ – People Who Can Eat People Are the Luckiest People in the WorldStreetlight Manifesto – Somewhere in the BetweenThe Gaslight Anthem – Sink or SwimA Wilhelm Scream – Career SuicideGrinderman – GrindermanStrung out- Blackhawks over Los Angeles

2008
Nana Grizol – Love It Love ItTitus Andronicus – The Airing of GrievancesThe Gaslight Anthem – The '59 SoundHave Heart – Songs to Scream at the SunDillinger Four – C I V I L W A R  
No use for a name- the Feel good record of the year
Millencolin- Machine 15
Lagwagon- I think my older brother used to listen to lagwagon

2009
Bomb the Music Industry! – ScramblesAJJ – Can't MaintainDefeater – Lost GroundBomb the Music Industry! – Others! Others! Volume 1NOFX- coaster
Propagandhi- Supporting castle
Strung out- agents of the underground
Green Day- 21st Century Breakdown

2010
Bomb the Music Industry! – Adults!!!... Smart!!! Shithammered!!! And Excited By Nothing!!!!!!!Nana Grizol – RuthTitus Andronicus – The MonitorKvelertak – KvelertakIron Chic – Not Like ThisThe Wonder Years – The UpsidesMotion City Soundtrack – My Dinosaur Life2011
Bomb the Music Industry! – VacationAJJ – Knife ManKing Gizzard & the Lizard Wizard – Willoughby's BeachThe Wonder Years – Suburbia I've Given You All and Now I'm NothingJoyce Manor – Joyce ManorFrank Turner – England Keep My BonesMayday Parade – Mayday Parade2012
Jeff Rosenstock – I Look Like ShitCloud Nothings – Attack on MemoryThe Menzingers – On the Impossible PastParquet Courts – Light Up GoldWhite Lung – SorryBirds in Row – You, Me & the ViolenceCode Orange Kids – Love Is Love // Return to DustProtomartyr – No Passion All TechniquePropagandhi- Failed states

2013
Days n' Daze – Rogue TaxidermyPUP – PUPStreetlight Manifesto – The Hands That ThieveIron Chic – The Constant One2014
Joyce Manor – Never Hungover AgainThe Smith Street Band – Throw Me in the RiverUnited Nations – The Next Four YearsAgainst Me! – Transgender Dysphoria BluesWhite Lung – Deep FantasyProtomartyr – Under Color of Official RightModern Baseball – You're Gonna Miss It AllLagwagon- Hang
Green Day- Demolicious

2015
Jeff Rosenstock – We Cool?Antarctigo Vespucci – Leavin' La Vida LocaKid Cudi – Speedin' Bullet 2 HeavenFrank Carter & The Rattlesnakes – BlossomThe Wonder Years – No Closer to HeavenLeftöver Crack – Constructs of the StateTitus Andronicus – The Most Lamentable TragedyFrank Turner – Positive Songs for Negative PeopleBeach Slang – The Things We Do to Find People Who Feel Like UsKnuckle Puck – CopaceticPWR BTTM – Ugly CherriesHarm's Way – RustStrung out- Transmission. Alpha. Delta

2016
Jeff Rosenstock – WORRY.PUP – The Dream Is OverAJJ – The Bible 2Green Day – Revolution RadioBlink-182 – CaliforniaKnocked Loose – Laugh TracksWhite Lung – ParadiseAgainst Me! – Shape Shift with MePierce the Veil – MisadventuresNOFX – First Ditch EffortViolent Femmes – We Can Do AnythingWaterparks – Double DareDescendents – Hypercaffium Spazzinate2017
Dead Cross – Dead CrossThe Menzingers – After the PartyThe Smith Street Band – More Scared of You Than You Are of MePropagandhi – Victory LapRancid – Trouble MakerIron Chic – You Can't Stay Here2018
Jeff Rosenstock – POST-Antarctigo Vespucci – Love in the Time of E-MailIdles – Joy as an Act of ResistanceTropical Fuck Storm – A Laughing Death in MeatspaceTurnstile – Time & SpaceBirds in Row – We Already Lost the WorldSuperchunk – What a Time to Be AliveHot Snakes – Jericho SirensAlkaline Trio – Is This Thing Cursed?2019
PUP – Morbid StuffTropical Fuck Storm – BraindropsAmyl and the Sniffers – Amyl and the SniffersBad Religion – Age of UnreasonPrince Daddy & The Hyena – Cosmic Thrill SeekersSum 41 – Order in DeclineTitus Andronicus – An ObeliskThe Menzingers – Hello ExileLagwagon- railer
Strung Out- Songs of Armor and Devotion

2020
Jeff Rosenstock – NO DREAMDogleg – MeleeIdles – Ultra MonoPUP – This Place Sucks Ass''

2021 
Nofx- single album

2022 
Ten foot pole- F around and find out

See also 
Lists of albums
Timeline of punk rock

References

 
Punk